Sam Yot station is a Bangkok MRT rapid transit station on the Blue Line, regarded as one of four most beautiful MRT stations (consisted of Itsaraphap station, Sanam Chai station, Sam Yot station, and Wat Mangkon station).

Location and design
It is located underground from Sam Yot Intersection of Charoen Krung Road and Maha Chai Road, of which the station is named after, to the Unakan Intersection between Charoen Krung and Burapha Roads, located in Bangkok, Thailand. 

The interior of the station has been designed to retain the atmosphere of the Wang Burapha quarter through the architectural style prevalent at the time of His Majesty King Chulalongkorn (Rama V)'s reign together with Sino-Portuguese style, three entrance building were built as entrance into the station and the wall carved to accommodate folding doors, an entrance style popular in the old days. As for the pillars in station and the ticket office, the shape and characteristic of the Sam Yot Arch (one of the Royal Grand Palace's outer city gates that was once located at eponymous intersection before the expansion of Charoen Krung Road) is used as decoration to convey the history of the area. The interior of the station also displays pictures of the old days giving insight to the history and origin of the location to passerby. That is why this station was originally named "Wang Burapha Station".

Sam Yot is an area bustling with activity, due to the presence of nearby shopping centres, including; Pratu Phi, Khlong Thom, Saphan Han, Phahurat, Sampheng, The Old Siam Plaza, Ban Mo, Pak Khlong Talat, Sala Chalermkrung, and leading education institutes, such as; Poh-Chang Academy of Arts and Suankularb Wittayalai School.

Archeological excavation at station area
In addition, during excavations to build the station, a number of ancient artifacts, all of which are related to trams that have passed here in the past, were discovered, such as, part of wooden used as building material, part of brick and drainage gutter line, part of steel rail of tramways and part of terracotta container, etc. Because it was the location of tramways alignment, Charoen Krung Line.

Future 
The station will connect to the MRT Purple Line once the southern extension from Tao Poon to Rat Burana is completed. Transfer hall was built in preparation of Purple Line extension. Cabinet approved the extension but the project is still yet to commence.

Gallery

References 

MRT (Bangkok) stations
2019 establishments in Thailand
Railway stations opened in 2019